Ron Thompson (July 5, 1953 – February 15, 2020) was an American electric blues and blues rock guitarist, singer and songwriter. Thompson released nine albums after 1983 on labels including Blind Pig.  He worked with Little Joe Blue, John Lee Hooker, Lowell Fulson, Etta James and Big Mama Thornton.

Thompson commented on his preferred style, "blues is like a medicine, or religion to me, it'll cleanse your soul". Meanwhile, Mick Fleetwood stated, "Ron Thompson is my favorite guitarist".

Life and career
Thompson was born in Oakland, California, United States, and had mastered basic guitar and slide guitar techniques by his mid-teens. He was educated at Newark High School, in Newark, California. In the early 1970s, Thompson played backing to Little Joe Blue, and worked solo and as a sideman in San Francisco Bay Area clubs. He joined John Lee Hooker's backing band in 1975, staying with him for three years.  In 1980, Thompson formed his own group, the Resistors, and secured a recording contract with Takoma Records. He played at the San Francisco Blues Festival in 1978, 1979 and 1983.

In 1983, he released his debut album, Treat Her Like Gold.  Thompson also found employment separately working with Lowell Fulson, Etta James and Big Mama Thornton.  Thompson's second album Resister Twister was released in 1987 and nominated for a Grammy Award, plus 1990's Just Like a Devil, was taken from his work on Mark Naftalin's Blue Monday Party radio show.

Thompson's 2007 album, Resonator was a purely acoustic production.

Ron Thompson died in Hayward, California on February 15, 2020, at the age of 66, due to complications from diabetes.

Discography
{| class="wikitable sortable"
|-
! Year || Title || Record label
|-
| 1983 || Treat Her Like Gold || style="text-align:center;"|Takoma
|-
| 1987 || Resister Twister || style="text-align:center;"|Blind Pig
|-
| 1990 || Just Like a Devil || style="text-align:center;"|Winner
|-
| 1998 || Magic Touch || style="text-align:center;"|Poore Boy
|-
| 2003 || Just Pickin || style="text-align:center;"|Acrobat Music
|-
| 2004 || Still Resisting || style="text-align:center;"|Poore Boy
|-
| 2007 || Resonator || style="text-align:center;"|32-20
|-
| 2015 || Son of Boogie Woogie || style="text-align:center;"|Little Village Foundation
|}With John Lee Hooker'''The Cream'' (Tomato, 1978)

See also
List of electric blues musicians

References

External links
Madera Tribune article (2004)
Takoma Records discography

1953 births
2020 deaths
American blues guitarists
American male guitarists
American blues singers
American male singers
Slide guitarists
Blues rock musicians
Songwriters from California
Electric blues musicians
Musicians from Oakland, California
People from Newark, California
Singers from California
Guitarists from California
20th-century American guitarists
20th-century American male musicians
American male songwriters